Hall Airport  is a privately owned, public use airport located six nautical miles (11 km) northwest of the central business district of Kaufman, a city in Kaufman County, Texas, United States.

Facilities and aircraft 
Hall Airport covers an area of 27 acres (11 ha) at an elevation of 440 feet (134 m) above mean sea level. It has one runway designated 17/35 with a turf surface measuring 2,585 by 40 feet (788 x 12 m).

For the 12-month period ending May 23, 2007, the airport had 201 general aviation aircraft operations, an average of 16 per month. At that time there were six aircraft based at this airport: 67% single-engine, 17% helicopter and 17% ultralight.

References

External links 
  at Texas DOT Airport Directory
 Aerial photo as of March 1995 from USGS The National Map via MSR Maps
 Aeronautical chart at SkyVector

Defunct airports in Texas
Airports in Texas
Transportation in Kaufman County, Texas